The Barnston Island Ferry is a ferry that runs across Parson's Channel (on the south side of the Fraser River) between Barnston Island and Port Kells, Surrey, in Metro Vancouver.

History 
In 1913, the Canadian Pacific Railway withdrew steamboat services on the Fraser, leaving the island farmers with no realistic way to transport their produce to market. That year, a government wharf was built.

In response to petitions from residents, the government ferry began operating in May 1916. This cable ferry had previously been used at the Pitt River crossing. However, floating driftwood and the underwater cable snagging fishing nets made the vessel unsuitable for the new location.

The next year, the ferry underwent a complete overhaul. Services were suspended during the spring high water for six weeks, and during winter when ice floes were hazardous, which proved inconvenient for the transportation of milk, grain, hay and potatoes.

1918 upgrade 
In 1918, the introduction of a gasoline boat, which pushed a small scow, enabled the carrying of passengers and limited produce.

1921 upgrade 
A larger gasoline launch was purchased in 1921. Substandard road conditions meant this  former fishing boat circumnavigated the island to load milk churns at various collection points. By 1927, the boat, which ran continuously during peak periods, was becoming old and inadequate.

1930 upgrade 
In 1930, the boat was replaced and a larger barge built. The  tug pushed the  barge, which could carry two vehicles. This beginning of vehicle transportation reflected increased vehicle numbers on the island and improved roads. After leaving the barge at the slipway, the tug continued to make a milk trip around the island. By 1933, travel was free, but the year tolls were removed is unclear.

When the river froze solid during winter, produce could be skated across the ice. In the 1936–37 winter, the ferry was refloated after floating ice had rammed it against the island slip. While the ferry was being overhauled, the upgrade service was limited to foot traffic. That September, while backing a car at the mainland slip, a ferry worker drove into the river. After struggling to exit the submerged vehicle, he finally surfaced.

1940 upgrade 
In 1940, the new  wooden Barnston Island tug replaced the obsolete vessel. That year, the circumnavigation of the island ceased. Operational hours were 7am to 7pm.

In 1944, a new  two-truck capacity barge arrived, and an infill above the high-water mark shortened the island landing ramp. In 1945–46, the island landing ramp received minor repairs and a seven-pile dolphin across the river was renewed.

While the fast-flowing river rapidly rose during the Fraser flood of 1948, 35 families, 500 head of cattle, 300 sheep, and numerous poultry, pigs and horses were evacuated on ferry barges adapted with additional railings to corral the livestock. In 1949, a freshet took out the island landing ramp, forcing the ferry to land on the beach for months.

At least until the 1950s, a truck would cross on the ferry and pick up the milk churns daily from around the island for delivery to Dairyland. In 1951, the upended wreck of a ferry that sank years previously was destroyed with explosives.

1954 upgrade 

In 1954, a new  steel barge was built. The Barnston Island No. 3 had a three-vehicle capacity.

Ferry captain since 1930, Len Thompson retired in 1962.

1963 upgrade 
In 1963, the Barnston Island No. 1, a  steel tug, replaced the wooden one, and the island landing was rebuilt.

In 1984, Western Pacific Marine won the contract to manage the service. The company started operating the service on April 1st of that year.

Later vessels 
The operator has used a series of similar tugs on the route, which included the Centurion V in the early 1990s.

After the 2009 withdrawal of the Albion Ferry, the Barnston Island Ferry, the Lytton Ferry and the Big Bar Ferry became the last remaining free inland ferries on the Fraser. Residents have sought a bridge link for over one hundred years.

Propelled by an attached tugboat, the barge can carry up to 6 vehicles and 52 passengers, but when 6 vehicles are aboard, the residual capacity is 28 passengers. The crossing time is usually five minutes. The ferry terminal landing is accessed from British Columbia Highway 1 by taking exit 53 into Port Kells, Surrey and proceeding to the end of 104th Avenue.

The ferry operates under private contract with the British Columbia Ministry of Transportation and is free of tolls, as are all inland ferries in British Columbia. The operation is Transport Canada Marine Safety inspected annually and all crew members are Transport Canada certified. The crossing operates on-demand from 6:15 am to 11:55 pm (12:55 am weekends). River conditions may interrupt the service. The school bus has boarding priority on school days.

Patronage
Recent years:

|- style="text-align:center"
|
Annual automobile equivalents

|
Annual passengers

See also
 List of crossings of the Fraser River
 List of inland ferries in British Columbia

References

Citations

Sources

External links 

Ferries of British Columbia
Barges of Canada
Crossings of the Fraser River